Jharkhand War Memorial is a war memorial as a tribute to the martyrs of Jharkhand. It was established in 2008, near the Booty Chowk, Dipatoli, Ranchi.

Overview
The memorial is dedicated to the soldiers from Jharkhand who had sacrificed their lives for the country from the period before independence to the current updated list. Inauguration of the Jharkhand War Memorial by His Excellency, Shri Syed Sibtey Razi, The Governor of Jharkhand at Army Cantonment, Dipatoli, Ranchi occurred on 31 October 2008. The structure of the cemetery is based on the structure of the body of a person. The cemetery consists of a museum with exotic collections from Jharkhand's past; rare traditional weapons, modern weapons and models of Jharkhand's industry and heritage.

References

External links
 

Monuments and memorials in Jharkhand
Indian military memorials and cemeteries
Buildings and structures in Ranchi